The 2017 TCR International Series Rustavi round was the first round of the 2017 TCR International Series season. It took place on 2 April at the Rustavi International Motorpark.

Davit Kajaia won the first race starting from pole position, driving an Alfa Romeo Giulietta TCR, and Pepe Oriola gained the second one, driving a SEAT León TCR.

Ballast
After the Adria testing session, the Balance of Performance was issued: The Audi RS3 LMS TCRs were given a +45 kg from the minimum weight of 1285 kg, while the Opel Astra TCRs were given +40 kg, the SEAT León TCRs and Honda Civic TCRs were given +30 kg, the Volkswagen Golf GTI TCRs were given +10 kg and the Alfa Romeo Giulietta TCRs were given -20 kg. Both the Volkswagen Golf GTI TCRs and Alfa Romeo Giulietta TCRs were given a -10mm in ride height, running at 70mm from the minimum 80mm in ride height.

Classification

Qualifying

Race 1

Race 2

Notes
 — Hugo Valente and Roberto Colciago received 30 seconds time penalties for overtaking under yellow flags.

Standings after the event

Drivers' Championship standings

Model of the Year standings

Teams' Championship standings

 Note: Only the top five positions are included for both sets of drivers' standings.

References

External links
TCR International Series official website

Rustavi
2017 in Georgian sport
April 2017 sports events in Asia
April 2017 sports events in Europe